William Gutiérrez-Levy (born August 29, 1980) is a Cuban-American actor and former model.

Early life and education 
Levy was born in Cojimar, Cuba. His maternal grandfather was Jewish (the origin of his surname, Levy), although he grew up in a non-religious household. He was raised by his single mother, Barbara Levy. His family, including his brother Jonathan Gutierrez Levy and sister Barbara Gutierrez Levy, emigrated to Miami, Florida when he was 14. He attended Barbara Goleman Senior high school, located in the suburb of Miami Lakes. After attending high school, he studied business administration on a baseball scholarship at St. Thomas University for two years. He later went to Los Angeles to study acting, and continued his acting studies in Miami and Mexico City.

Career 
Levy worked as a model for the Next Models agency, and was featured in two reality shows broadcast by Telemundo: Isla de la Tentación and Protagonistas de Novela 2. In 2005 he performed at the Centro de Bellas Artes in San Juan, Puerto Rico, starring in the play La Nena Tiene Tumbao.

His debut on the Spanish-language channel Univision was in the Venevision International production of Olvidarte Jamás. He later appeared in Mi Vida Eres Tu and Acorralada. In 2008, he appeared in his first film, Retazos de Vida, directed by Viviana Cordero. He was invited by television producer Carla Estrada to star in Pasión, his breakthrough in Mexican telenovelas. Televisa cast him as the lead in Cuidado con el Angel with actress and ex-RBD singer Maite Perroni. The show was first broadcast in Mexico in June 2008, and began airing in the United States in September 2008 on Univision. It averaged 5 million viewers per evening.

Levy starred alongside Jacqueline Bracamontes on Sortilegio in 2009 Sortilegio aired on Univision, and the finale drew 6.6 million viewers, beating ABC and CBS for viewers in that time slot. In November 2009, the actor lent his voice to the Spanish version of the animated movie Planet 51. The movie opened on November 27 in Mexico and won an award for best animated Spanish-language film of 2009 (Premios Goya). From November 2009 to February 2010, Levy toured several Mexican cities with the play Un Amante a la Medida, which toured in the United States in June 2010.

Levy participated in the Mexican telenovela Triunfo del Amor, a remake of the Venezuelan classic Cristal, again with Maite Perroni. The telenovela aired on October 25, 2010, in El Canal de las Estrellas. Pedro Torres, executive producer of Mujeres Asesinas, confirmed Levy's role in the third season of the popular Mexican series. Levy starred as Jennifer Lopez's love interest in the music video "I'm Into You", from her album Love?. It aired on NBC's Today on May 2, 2011. Levy appeared on the cover of People en Español for its special issue on the sexiest men of the year for 2011.

In January 2012, it was announced that Levy would appear in two episodes of the VH1 television series Single Ladies, with Denise Vasi. He was a participant in the 14th season of Dancing with the Stars, with two-time mirror ball champion Cheryl Burke as his dance-pro partner; they finished in third place. In December 2012 Levy was cast as Captain Damian Fabre for the remake of La Tormenta titled La Tempestad which aired in 2013. Levy starred in Addicted an erotic drama based on the novel of the same name by Zane. Variety named Levy one of the Top 10 Latino Actors and Actresses in Hollywood.

Levy co-starred in Tyler Perry's film The Single Moms Club (2014). Levy was cast in the lead role as Warrior in the Brent Ryan Green film The Veil (2017). In 2018, he began his role as Mateo Ferrera in the Fox musical drama series Star.

Personal life
Levy is a naturalized United States citizen. He has been in an on-off relationship with Mexican-American actress Elizabeth Gutiérrez since 2003, and they have two children together, a son, Christopher Alexander, in 2006, and a daughter, Kailey Alexandra, on March 6, 2010. On July 11, 2009, Levy converted to Catholicism.

Name change
He was born as William Gutiérrez Levy. He got the idea for his name change from a friend of his parents who tried helping the family get out of Cuba while William's mother was still pregnant, as he told Entertainment Tonight. Levy is his mother's Jewish last name.

Nude photos
In May 2012, while competing on Dancing with the Stars, nude photos of Levy leaked. Levy responded by saying "I'm used to that already. [The photos] have been out already all over the world. I was a model when I did these things, so as a model there's nothing wrong [with] doing those kind[s] of things. You gotta work. You gotta make money".

Activism
Levy is a philanthropist and donates his time to fix houses for low-income families in Mexico as part of the "Alianzas que Construyen" Televisa Foundation.

Dancing with the Stars performances 
Levy was announced to be a contestant on ABC's Dancing With The Stars partnering with two-time champion Cheryl Burke for season 14.

Filmography

Theater 
 Un amante a la medida (2009–10)

Awards and nominations

Premios Bravo

Premios Juventud

Premios TVyNovelas

Califa de oro

Premios Casandra

People en Español

Lists 
 2011: He appeared in People en Españols list of the 50 handsomest men.
 2009: People en Español named him as one of "Los 25 hombres más guapos".
 2009: People en Español named him as one of "Los 50 más bellos".
 2008: Quién named him as one of "Los 12 hombres más sexys".
 2008: People en Español named him as one of "Los 50 más bellos".
 2006: People en Español named him as one of "Los 20 solteros más sexys".
 2006: People en Español named him as one of "Los 20 solteros más sexys".

References

External links 
 
 

1980 births
21st-century American male actors
American male film actors
Hispanic and Latino American male models
American male stage actors
American male telenovela actors
American male voice actors
American Roman Catholics
Converts to Roman Catholicism
Cuban emigrants to the United States
People with acquired American citizenship
Cuban male stage actors
Cuban male telenovela actors
Cuban male voice actors
Cuban Roman Catholics
Cuban people of Spanish-Jewish descent
Hispanic and Latino American male actors
Living people
Male actors from Miami
Participants in American reality television series